Jamie A. Davies is a British scientist, Professor of Experimental Anatomy at the University of Edinburgh, and leader of a laboratory in its Centre for Integrative Physiology. He works in the fields of Developmental biology, Synthetic biology, and Tissue engineering. He is also Principal Investigator for the IUPHAR/BPS Guide to Pharmacology database.

Biography 

Davies received his BA, MA, and, in 1989,  D. Phil, all at University of Cambridge. He then took up post doctoral fellowships first at the University of Manchester, and then at the University of Southampton before being appointed to Edinburgh. He was initially appointed in 1995 as a lecturer, rising to senior lecturer, reader, and finally professor.

Davies was the founding editor of the journal Organogenesis and is on the editorial boards of Journal of Anatomy, and Nephron. He is a fellow of the Royal Society of Edinburgh, the Royal Society of Biology, the Royal Society of Medicine, a Principle Fellow of the Higher Education Academy and, though his 'other life' as a dance teacher, a Fellow of the Royal Society of Arts. He is also a member of the Institute of Electrical and Electronics Engineers. He served on the board of the National Centre for 3Rs from 2009 to 2014, and was deputy chair from 2012.

Books 
 Davies J.A. (2004) Branching Morphogenesis. Springer.
 Davies J.A. (2004) Mechanisms of Morphogenesis. Elsevier/ Academic Press
 Davies J.A. (2012) Replacing animal models: a practical guide to creating and using culture-based biomimetic alternatives. Wiley-Blackwell.
 Davies J.A. (2012) Tissue Regeneration. InTech.
 Davies J.A. (2013) Mechanisms of Morphogenesis (2nd Edition). Elsevier/ Academic Press.
 Davies J.A. (2014) Life Unfolding. Oxford University Press.
Davies J.A. (2018) Synthetic Biology: A Very Short Introduction. Oxford University Press.
Davies J.A. & Lawrence M.L. (2018) Organoids and Mini-organs. Academic Press.
Davies J.A.  (2020) Synthetic biology in mammals . Oxford University Press
Davies J.A. (2021) Human Physiology: A Very Short Introduction. Oxford University Press.

References

External links 
Official web site at Edinburgh
Full list of publications through 2010
 Publications from 2002 to present

British anatomists
Academics of the University of Edinburgh
Year of birth missing (living people)
Place of birth missing (living people)
Living people
Synthetic biologists
Fellows of the Royal Society of Edinburgh